New Tech High at Zion-Benton East, or New Tech, is a public high school in Zion, Illinois, a suburb of Chicago. It is in Zion-Benton Township High School District 126.

References

External links 
 
 New Tech Network Official Website
 Zion-Benton Township High School Official Website

Public high schools in Illinois
Educational institutions established in 2008
Zion, Illinois
Schools in Lake County, Illinois
2008 establishments in Illinois